Sarusajai is a locality in the southern part of Guwahati, Assam, India. It is surrounded by Lalmati, Lokhra, Bhetapara, Hatigaon and Basistha and is near to National Highway 37. It is the location of Indira Gandhi Athletic Stadium.

See also
 Pan Bazaar
 Paltan Bazaar
 Beltola

References

Neighbourhoods in Guwahati